Dong Jialin (born 6 April 1993) is a Chinese football player.

Club career
Dong started his professional football career in 2011 when he was loaned to Shanghai Zobon's squad for the 2011 China League Two campaign. He joined Chinese Super League's newcomer Shanghai Dongya in 2013. On 21 May 2013, he made his debut for Shanghai Dongya in the third round of 2013 Chinese FA Cup which Shanghai Dongya beat Chongqing Lifan 6–5 in the penalty shootout.

On 3 February 2016, Dong transferred to fellow Chinese Super League side Yanbian Funde. He made his debut for the club on 2 May 2017 in the third round of 2017 Chinese FA Cup which Yanbian lost to Suzhou Dongwu in the penalty shoot-out. On 2 July 2017, he made his Super League debut in a 2–1 away win against Guizhou Zhicheng.

Career statistics 
Statistics accurate as of match played 31 December 2021.

References

External links
 

1993 births
Living people
Chinese footballers
Sportspeople from Anshan
Footballers from Liaoning
Pudong Zobon players
Shanghai Port F.C. players
Yanbian Funde F.C. players
Chinese Super League players
Association football goalkeepers